The Indo-Pakistani War of 1971 was a military confrontation between India and Pakistan that occurred during the Bangladesh Liberation War in East Pakistan and West Pakistan from 3 December 1971 to the Fall of Dacca (Dhaka) on 16 December 1971. The war saw intense use of aerial assets by both sides and proved to be instrumental in the Indian victory in East Pakistan (Bangladesh).

The following lists contains aerial victories credited to both Indian as well as Pakistani pilots.

Eastern sector (Bangladesh) 
Probable or Unconfirmed kills are in italics text

Western sector 
Probable Kills or Unconfirmed kills are in italics text;

List of aircraft mentioned

India

Pakistan

See also 

 Battle Of Boyra
 Indo-Pakistani War of 1971
East Pakistan Air Operations (1971)
Operation Chengiz Khan
Operation Cactus-Lily

References

Sources 

 Jagan, PVS; Chopra, Samir; (2013), Eagles Over Bangladesh, HarperCollinsIN, ISBN 978-93-5136-163-3
 "Boyra Boys & under-3 minute air battle", Anshuman Mainkar, ThePrint, 22 Nov 2019
 "Pakistani Air Losses of the 1971 War (Official List)" Bharat-Rakshak.com
 "Indian Air Losses of the 1971 War (Unofficial List)" Bharat-Rakshak.com
"IAF, IA and IN Aircraft Losses Database" Bharat-Rakshak.com
"IAF COMBAT KILLS - 1971 INDO-PAK AIR WAR" Orbat,info
"1971 GALLANTRY AWARDS PAF" Heroes - Pakistan Air Force Museum

Citations 

Indo-Pakistani War of 1971
Indo-Pakistani War of 1971
Pakistan Air Force
Indian Air Force